Tai Po Tsai is a village on Sai Kung Peninsula, in Sai Kung District, Hong Kong.

Administration
Tai Po Tsai is a recognized village under the New Territories Small House Policy.

References

External links
 Tai Po Tsai (Sai Kung) for election of resident representative (2019 to 2022)

Villages in Sai Kung District, Hong Kong
Sai Kung Peninsula